Grenada Boys' Secondary School FC is a Grenadian football club from St. George's, Grenada that plays in the Grenada Premier Division. The club represents the Grenada Boys' Secondary School.

Honors
Grenada League: 2
 2000, 2001

References

Grenada Boys Secondary School